Erich Meier (30 March 1935 – 8 February 2010) was a German footballer who played as a winger. With Eintracht Frankfurt, Meier won the German championship in 1959 and reached the 1960 European Cup Final against Real Madrid. In his main profession he was a construction technician.

Career
Meier started his career with amateur side FV 09 Breidenbach, and moved to Frankfurt in 1956. Erich Meier had his highlights in the matches of the European Cup 1959–60, as he scored four goals in six fixtures. Thus his nickname is originated, Flood light Meier. Arguably his two most remembered appearances include the final match at Glaswegian Hampden Park in the second leg of the semi final at Rangers, when he contributed two goals to the 6–3 victory.

In the Oberliga he was overshadowed by Lothar Schämer, so he moved to 1. FC Kaiserslautern in 1962. After that, he moved to the Netherlands, where he played for Alkmaar '54 and AGOVV Apeldoorn, where he ended his career at the end of the 1965–66 season.

References

External links
 Erich Meier at eintracht-archiv.de 
 

1935 births
2010 deaths
German footballers
Footballers from Hesse
Association football wingers
Bundesliga players
Eintracht Frankfurt players
1. FC Kaiserslautern players
AZ Alkmaar players
AGOVV Apeldoorn players
West German expatriate footballers
West German expatriate sportspeople in the Netherlands
Expatriate footballers in the Netherlands
People from Marburg-Biedenkopf
Sportspeople from Giessen (region)
West German footballers